Valentina Fedjuschina (born 10 February 1965 in Moscow) is a retired Austrian shot putter.

She originally competed for Soviet Union and Ukraine, but became an Austrian citizen in 1999 to compete in the Sydney Olympic games for this country. She is married to discus thrower Volodymyr Zinchenko.

Her personal best put is 21.08 metres, achieved in May 1988 in Leselidze. She holds the 3rd best ever indoor performance with 21.60 meters, in Simferopol.

As an Austrian citizen she has set a national record for that country with 19.21 metres in July 1999 in Casablanca.

International competitions

References

1965 births
Living people
Ukrainian female shot putters
Soviet female shot putters
Austrian female shot putters
Olympic athletes of the Soviet Union
Athletes (track and field) at the 1988 Summer Olympics
Olympic athletes of Ukraine
Athletes (track and field) at the 1996 Summer Olympics
Olympic athletes of Austria
Athletes (track and field) at the 2000 Summer Olympics
World Athletics Championships athletes for Ukraine
World Athletics Championships athletes for Austria
Goodwill Games medalists in athletics
Competitors at the 1998 Goodwill Games
Athletes from Moscow